A very famous village in kurnool district , Holagunda is a village and a Mandal in Kurnool district in the state of Andhra Pradesh, India.....

References 

Villages in Kurnool district